James Noel Mooney (August 13, 1919 – March 30, 2008) was an American comics artist best known for his long tenure at DC Comics and as the signature artist of Supergirl, as well as a Marvel Comics inker and Spider-Man artist, both during what comics historians and fans call the Silver Age of Comic Books and what is known as the Bronze Age of Comic Books. He sometimes inked under the pseudonym Jay Noel.

Biography

Early life and career
Jim Mooney was born in New York City and raised in Los Angeles. Friends with pulp-fiction author Henry Kuttner and Californian science-fiction fans such as Forrest J. Ackerman, he drew the cover for the first issue of Imagination, an Ackerman fanzine that included Ray Bradbury's first published story, "Hollerbochen's Dilemma".  Kuttner encouraged the teenaged Mooney to submit art to Farnsworth Wright, the editor of the pulp magazine for which Kuttner was writing, Weird Tales.  Mooney's first professional sale was an illustration for one of Kuttner's stories in that magazine. During this period, Mooney also met future comic-book editors Mort Weisinger and Julius Schwartz, who had come to the area to meet Kuttner.

After attending art school and working as a parking valet and other odd jobs for nightclubs, Mooney went to New York City in 1940 to enter the fledgling comic-book field. Following his first assignment, the new feature "The Moth" in Fox Publications' Mystery Men Comics #9–12 (April–July 1940), Mooney worked for the comic-book packager Eisner & Iger, one of the studios that would supply outsourced comics to publishers testing the waters of the new medium. He left voluntarily after two weeks: "I was just absolutely crestfallen when I looked at some of the guys’ work. Lou Fine was working there, Nick Cardy ... and Eisner himself. I was beginning to feel that I was way, way in beyond my depth...."

Mooney went on staff at Fiction House for approximately nine months, working on features including "Camilla" and "Suicide Smith" and becoming friends with colleagues George Tuska, Ruben Moreira, and Cardy. He began freelancing for Timely Comics, the 1940s predecessor of Marvel, working on that company's "animation" line of talking animal and movie-cartoon tie-in comics.

As Mooney describes his being hired by editor-in-chief and art director Stan Lee:

Mooney also wrote and drew a talking animal feature, "Perky Penguin and Booby Bear", in 1946 and 1947 for Treasure Chest, the Catholic-oriented comic book distributed in parochial schools.

Supergirl and DC
In 1946, Mooney began a 22-year association with the company that would evolve into DC. He began with the series Batman as a ghost artist for credited artist Bob Kane. As Mooney recalled of coming to DC,

Writer Bill Finger and Mooney introduced the Catman character in Detective Comics #311 (Jan. 1963). Mooney branched out to the series Superboy, and such features as "Dial H for Hero" in House of Mystery, and  Tommy Tomorrow in both Action Comics and World's Finest Comics. He also contributed to Atlas Comics, the 1950s iteration of Marvel, on at least a handful of 1953-54 issues of Lorna the Jungle Queen.

Most notably, Mooney drew the backup feature "Supergirl" in Action Comics from 1959 to 1968. For much of this run on his signature character, Mooney lived in Los Angeles, managing an antiquarian book store on Hollywood Boulevard and sometimes hiring art students to work in the store and ink backgrounds on his pencilled pages. By 1968, he had moved back to New York, where DC, he recalled, was

Spider-Man and Marvel

By now, however, the rates were closer, and Mooney left DC. Marvel editor Stan Lee had him work with The Amazing Spider-Man penciler John Romita. Mooney first worked on Spider-Man by inking The Spectacular Spider-Man magazine's two issues. Mooney would go on to ink a run of Amazing Spider-Man (#65, 67-88; Oct. 1968, Dec. 1968 - Sept. 1970), which he recalled as "finalising it over John’s layouts". Among the new characters introduced during Mooney's run on the title were Randy Robertson as a member of the supporting cast in issue #67 (Dec. 1968) and the Prowler in #78 (Nov. 1969). Mooney also embellished John Buscema's pencils on many issues of The Mighty Thor.

As a penciler, Mooney did several issues of Peter Parker, the Spectacular Spider-Man, as well as Spider-Man stories in Marvel Team-Up, and he both penciled and inked issues of writer Steve Gerber's Man-Thing and the entire 10-issue run of Gerber's cult-hit Omega the Unknown, among many other titles. Mooney named his collaborations with Gerber as being among his personal favorites. In 2010, Comics Bulletin ranked Gerber and Mooney's run on Omega the Unknown tenth on its list of the "Top 10 1970s Marvels". Carrion debuted in The Spectacular Spider-Man #25 (Dec. 1978) by Bill Mantlo and Mooney. Writer Ralph Macchio and Mooney introduced the Rapier in The Spectacular Spider-Man Annual #2 (1980).

Mooney also worked on Marvel-related coloring books, for the child-oriented Spidey Super Stories, and for a Spider-Man feature in a children's-magazine spin-off of the PBS educational series The Electric Company, which included segments featuring Spider-Man. On the other end of the spectrum, he drew in the late 1960s and early 1970s for Marvel publisher Martin Goodman's bawdy men's-adventure magazines comics feature entitled "Pussycat. The feature appeared in "Men's Annual," "Male Annual" and "Stag" magazines. A one shot reprint of those stories appeared in 1968's "The Adventures of Pussycat":  "Stan [Lee] wrote the first one I did, and then his brother Larry [Lieber] wrote the ones that came later".Stan Lee was not the editor of this reprint, Goodman's son Chip was.

In 1975, Mooney, wanting to move to Florida, negotiated a 10-year contract with Marvel to supply artwork from there. "It was a good deal. The money wasn't too great, but I was paid every couple of weeks, I had insurance, and I had a lot of security that most freelancers never had". That same year, Mooney and his wife, Anne, had a daughter, Nolle.

Later life and career
In Florida, Mooney co-created Adventure Publications' Star Rangers with writer Mark Ellis, and  worked on Superboy for DC Comics, Anne Rice's The Mummy for Millennium Publications, and the Creepy miniseries for Harris Comics. When Harris editor Richard Howell left to co-found Claypool Comics in 1993, Mooney produced many stories for the 166-issue run of Elvira, Mistress of the Dark and became the regular inker on writer Peter David's Soulsearchers and Company, over the pencils of Amanda Conner, Neil Vokes, John Heebink, and mostly Dave Cockrum. Mooney also inked four covers of Howell's Deadbeats series. Mooney's other later work included the sole issue of writer Mark Evanier's Flaxen, over Howell pencils; a retro "Lady Supreme" story for Awesome Entertainment; and commissioned pieces. In 1996, Mooney was one of the many creators who contributed to the Superman: The Wedding Album one-shot wherein the title character married Lois Lane.

Mooney's wife Anne died in 2005. Mooney died March 30, 2008, in Florida after an extended illness.

Bibliography
Comics work (pencils or inking) includes:

DC Comics

Action Comics (Tommy Tomorrow) #172–196, 199–251; (Supergirl) #253–342, 344–350, 353–358, 360–373 (1952–1969); (Superman) #667 (among other artists) (1991)
Adventure Comics #91, 284 (1944–1961); (Legion of Super-Heroes) #328–331, 361 (1965–1967)
Adventures of Superboy (based on TV Series) #18–20 (1991)
The Adventures of Superman #480 (among other artists) (1991)
Batman #38, 41, 43–44, 48–49, 53–54, 56, 59–60, 72, 76, 148, 150 (1946–1962)
Detective Comics #126, 132, 134, 143, 163, 181, 296, 299, 311, 318 (1947–1963)
The Flash vol. 2 #19 (1988)
House of Mystery #2, 5–6, 10, 20, 23–24, 27, 30, 32–35, 39–40, 46–47, 49, 51, 56, 70, 83, 85, 156–170, 178 (1952–1969)
House of Secrets #1, 3–4, 9 (1956–1958)
Star Spangled Comics (Robin) #74, 76–95, 97–130 (1947–1952)
Superboy The Comic Book (based on TV series) #1–8 (1990)
Superman #185 (1966)
Superman's Pal Jimmy Olsen #92 (1966)
Superman: The Wedding Album (among other artists) (1996)
Tales of the Unexpected #10, 17–19, 23–25, 28, 32–33, 35–37, 39–46, 48–49, 53 (1957–1960)
World's Finest Comics (Batman) #27, 37, 39–40, 42, 44; (Tommy Tomorrow) #102–120; (Superman and Batman) #121–130, 132–134, 136–140 (1947–1964)

Marvel Comics

The Amazing Spider-Man #65, 67–82, 84–88, 116–118, 126, 173–175, 178, 189–190, 192–193, 196–202, 205, 211–219, 221–222, 226–227, 229–233 (1968–1982)
The Avengers #86, 88, 105, 179–180 (1971–1979)
Battlestar Galactica #14 (1980)
Crypt of Shadows #3, 5, 16 (1973–1975)
Ghost Rider #2–9 (1973–1974)
The Incredible Hulk vol. 2 #230 (1978)
Invaders #16 (1977)
Journey into Mystery vol. 2 #8 (1973)
Man-Thing #17–22 (1975)
Man-Thing vol. 2 #1–3 (1979–1980)
Marvel Comics Presents #16, 73 (1989–1991)
Marvel Spotlight #14–17, 27 (1974–1976)
Marvel Team-Up #2, 7–8, 10–11, 16, 24–31, 72, 93 (1973–1978)
Ms. Marvel #4–8, 13, 15–18 (1977–1978)
Omega the Unknown #1–10 (1976–1977)
Solarman #1 (1989)
Son of Satan #1 (1975)
The Spectacular Spider-Man #7, 11, 21, 23, 25–26, 29–34, 36–37, 39, 41–42, 49–57, 59–63, 65–66, 68, 71, 73–79, 81–83, 85–99, 102, 125, Annual #1–2 (1977–1987)
The Spectacular Spider-Man magazine #1–2 (1968)
Spider-Man, Firestar and Iceman at the Dallas Ballet Nutcracker (1983)
Sub-Mariner #65–66 (1973)
Thor #188, 201, 204, 214–216, 218, 322, 324–325, 327 (1971–1983)
Thundercats #1–6, 19 (1985–1988)
Web of Spider-Man #1–3, 5–6, 10 (1985–1986)

References

External links

 Supergirl at Don Markstein's Toonopedia. WebCitation archive 11-25-09
 Jim Mooney at Mike's Amazing World of Comics
 Jim Mooney at the Unofficial Handbook of Marvel Comics Creators

1919 births
2008 deaths
20th-century American artists
21st-century American artists
American comics artists
DC Comics people
Golden Age comics creators
Marvel Comics people
Silver Age comics creators